These genera belong to Blaptinae, a subfamily of darkling beetles in the family Tenebrionidae.

Blaptinae genera

 Ablapsis Reitter, 1887  (the Palearctic)
 Aconobius Casey, 1895  (North America)
 Adamus Iwan, 1997  (Indomalaya)
 Adavius Mulsant & Rey, 1859  (the Palearctic and Indomalaya)
 Adoryacus Koch, 1963  (tropical Africa)
 Agnaptoria Reitter, 1887  (the Palearctic)
 Alaetrinus Iwan, 1995  (North America and the Neotropics)
 Allophylax Bedel, 1906  (the Palearctic)
 Amathobius Gebien, 1920  (tropical Africa)
 Amatodes Dejean, 1834  (tropical Africa)
 Amblychirus Koch, 1956  (tropical Africa)
 Amblysphagus Fairmaire, 1896  (tropical Africa and Indomalaya)
 Ametrocera Fåhraeus, 1870  (tropical Africa)
 Ammidium Erichson, 1843  (tropical Africa)
 Ammobius Guérin-Méneville, 1844  (the Palearctic and Indomalaya)
 Ammodonus Mulsant & Rey, 1859  (North America and the Neotropics)
 Amphithrixoides Bouchard & Löbl, 2008  (the Palearctic)
 Anatrum Reichardt, 1936  (the Palearctic)
 Anaxius Fåhraeus, 1870  (tropical Africa)
 Anchophthalmops Koch, 1956  (North America and Indomalaya)
 Anchophthalmus Gerstaecker, 1854  (tropical Africa)
 Angolositus Koch, 1955  (tropical Africa)
 Anomalipus Guérin-Méneville, 1831  (tropical Africa)
 Apsheronellus Bogatchev, 1967  (the Palearctic)
 Aptila Fåhraeus, 1870  (tropical Africa)
 Arabammobius Grimm & Lillig, 2020  (the Palearctic and tropical Africa)
 Asidoblaps Fairmaire, 1886  (the Palearctic and Indomalaya)
 Asidodema Koch, 1958  (tropical Africa)
 Asiocaedius G.S. Medvedev & Nepesova, 1985  (the Palearctic)
 Atrocrates Koch, 1956  (tropical Africa)
 Atrocrypticanus Iwan, 1999  (tropical Africa)
 Austrocaribius Marcuzzi, 1954  (the Neotropics)
 Bantodemus Koch, 1955  (tropical Africa)
 Belousovia G.S. Medvedev, 2007  (the Palearctic)
 Bermejoina Español, 1944  (the Palearctic)
 Bioplanes Mulsant, 1854  (the Palearctic)
 Bioramix Bates, 1879  (the Palearctic)
 Blacodatus Koch, 1963  (tropical Africa)
 Blaps Fabricius, 1775  (North America, tropical Africa, Indomalaya, Australasia, and Oceania)
 Blapstinus Dejean, 1821  (North America, the Neotropics, and Oceania)
 Blaptogonia G.S. Medvedev, 1998  (the Palearctic and Indomalaya)
 Blastarnodes Koch, 1958  (tropical Africa)
 Blenosia Laporte, 1840  (tropical Africa)
 Brachyesthes Fairmaire, 1868  (the Palearctic and Indomalaya)
 Brachyidium Fairmaire, 1883  (Indomalaya, Australasia, and Oceania)
 Byrrhoncus Koch, 1954  (tropical Africa)
 Cabirutus Strand, 1929  (the Palearctic and Indomalaya)
 Caediexis Lebedev, 1932  (the Palearctic)
 Caediomorpha Blackburn, 1888  (Australasia)
 Caedius Blanchard, 1845  (the Palearctic, tropical Africa, Indomalaya, and Australasia)
 Calaharena Koch, 1963  (tropical Africa)
 Capidium Koch, 1954  (tropical Africa)
 Caraboblaps Bauer, 1921*
 Cenophorus Mulsant & Rey, 1859  (the Neotropics)
 Clastopus Fairmaire, 1898  (tropical Africa)
 Claudegirardius Iwan, 1999  (tropical Africa)
 Clitobius Mulsant & Rey, 1859  (the Palearctic and tropical Africa)
 Coelocnemodes Bates, 1879  (Indomalaya)
 Coeloecetes Blair, 1929  (Indomalaya)
 Colasia Koch, 1965  (the Palearctic)
 Colophonesthes Koch, 1954  (tropical Africa)
 Colpotinoides Kaszab, 1975  (tropical Africa)
 Colpotinus Fairmaire, 1891  (the Palearctic)
 Conibiosoma Casey, 1890  (North America)
 Conibius LeConte, 1851  (North America, the Neotropics, and Oceania)
 Corinta Koch, 1950  (tropical Africa)
 Cornopterus Koch, 1950  (tropical Africa)
 Crististibes Koch, 1963  (tropical Africa)
 Crypticanus Fairmaire, 1897  (tropical Africa)
 Cybotus Casey, 1890  (the Neotropics)
 Cyptus Gerstaecker, 1871  (the Palearctic and tropical Africa)
 Dendarophylan Español, 1945  (the Palearctic)
 Dendarus Dejean, 1821  (the Palearctic)
 Diaderma Koch, 1960  (tropical Africa)
 Diastolinus Mulsant & Rey, 1859  (the Neotropics)
 Diestecopus Solier, 1848  (tropical Africa)
 Dila Fischer von Waldheim, 1844  (the Palearctic)
 Dilablaps Bogatchev, 1976  (the Palearctic)
 Dilamus Jacquelin du Val, 1861  (the Palearctic and tropical Africa)
 Diphyrrhynchus Fairmaire, 1849  (the Palearctic, tropical Africa, Indomalaya, Australasia, and Oceania)
 Doyenus Iwan, 1996  (tropical Africa)
 Drosochrus Erichson, 1843  (the Palearctic and tropical Africa)
 Ectateus Koch, 1956  (tropical Africa)
 Eichleria Kaminski, 2015  (tropical Africa)
 Eleodes Eschscholtz, 1829  (desert stink beetles)  (North America and the Neotropics)
 Eleodimorpha Blaisdell, 1909  (North America)
 Eleoselinus Kaminski, 2014  (tropical Africa)
 Embaphion Say, 1824  (North America)
 Emmalus Erichson, 1843  (tropical Africa)
 Ephalus LeConte, 1862  (North America and the Neotropics)
 Eremostibes Koch, 1963  (tropical Africa)
 Eucolus Mulsant & Rey, 1853  (Indomalaya)
 Eumylada Reitter, 1904  (the Palearctic)
 Eurycaulus Fairmaire, 1868  (the Palearctic and tropical Africa)
 Eurynotus W. Kirby, 1819  (tropical Africa)
 Eviropodus Koch, 1956  (tropical Africa)
 Falsammidium Koch, 1960  (tropical Africa)
 Falsocaedius Español, 1943  (the Palearctic)
 Falsolobodera Kaszab, 1967  (the Palearctic)
 Freyula Koch, 1959  (tropical Africa)
 Glyptopteryx Gebien, 1910  (tropical Africa)
 Gnaptor Brullé, 1831  (the Palearctic)
 Gnaptorina Reitter, 1887  (the Palearctic and Indomalaya)
 Goajiria Ivie & Hart, 2016  (the Neotropics)
 Gonocephalum Solier, 1834  (North America, tropical Africa, Indomalaya, Australasia, and Oceania)
 Gonopus Latreille, 1828  (tropical Africa)
 Gridelliopus Koch, 1956  (tropical Africa)
 Guildia Antoine, 1957  (the Palearctic)
 Hadroderus Koch, 1956  (tropical Africa)
 Hadrodes Wollaston, 1877  (the Palearctic)
 Hadrophasis Ferrer, 1992  (tropical Africa)
 Haemodus Gebien, 1943  (tropical Africa)
 Hanstroemium Koch, 1953  (tropical Africa)
 Helenomelas Ardoin, 1972  (the Palearctic)
 Helibatus Mulsant & Rey, 1859  (tropical Africa)
 Heliopates Dejean, 1834  (the Palearctic)
 Heterocheira Dejean, 1836  (tropical Africa and Australasia)
 Heteropsectropus Kaszab, 1941  (tropical Africa)
 Heterotarsus Latreille, 1829  (the Palearctic, tropical Africa, and Indomalaya)
 Hirtograbies Koch, 1954  (tropical Africa)
 Holoblaps Bauer, 1921*
 Hoplarion Mulsant & Rey, 1854  (the Palearctic)
 Hoplitoblaps Fairmaire, 1889  (Indomalaya)
 Hovademus Iwan, 1996  (tropical Africa)
 Hovarygmus Fairmaire, 1898  (tropical Africa)
 Hummelinckia Marcuzzi, 1954  (the Neotropics)
 Isoncophallus Koch, 1954  (tropical Africa)
 Itagonia Reitter, 1887  (the Palearctic)
 Jintaium Ren, 1999  (the Palearctic)
 Lariversius Blaisdell, 1947  (North America)
 Lasioderus Mulsant & Rey, 1854  (tropical Africa)
 Lechius Iwan, 1995  (tropical Africa)
 Leichenum Dejean, 1834  (North America, the Palearctic, Indomalaya, Australasia, and Oceania)
 Litoboriolus Español, 1945  (the Palearctic)
 Litoborus Mulsant & Rey, 1854  (the Palearctic)
 Litororus Reitter, 1904  (the Palearctic)
 Loensus R. Lucas, 1920  (tropical Africa and Indomalaya)
 Luebbertia Koch, 1963  (tropical Africa)
 Madobalus Fairmaire, 1901  (tropical Africa)
 Mateuina Español, 1944  (the Palearctic)
 Medvedevia Chigray, 2019  (the Palearctic)
 Medvedevoblaps Bouchard & Bousquet, 2021  (the Palearctic)
 Meglyphus Motschulsky, 1872  (tropical Africa)
 Melambius Mulsant & Rey, 1854  (the Palearctic)
 Melanesthes Dejean, 1834  (the Palearctic)
 Melanocoma Wollaston, 1868  (tropical Africa)
 Melanocratus Fairmaire, 1895  (tropical Africa)
 Melanopterus Mulsant & Rey, 1854  (tropical Africa)
 Melansis Wollaston, 1864  (the Palearctic)
 Melasmana Strand, 1935  (the Palearctic)
 Menearchus Carter, 1920  (tropical Africa)
 Menederes Solier, 1848  (tropical Africa)
 Menederopsis Koch, 1954  (tropical Africa)
 Mesomorphus Miedel, 1880  (the Palearctic, tropical Africa, Indomalaya, Australasia, and Oceania)
 Messoricolum Koch, 1960  (tropical Africa)
 Micrantereus Solier, 1848  (the Palearctic and tropical Africa)
 Microphylacinus Iwan, Kaminski & Aalbu, 2011  (tropical Africa)
 Microplatyscelis Kaszab, 1940  (the Palearctic)
 Micrositus Mulsant & Rey, 1854  (the Palearctic)
 Microstizopus Koch, 1963  (tropical Africa)
 Minorus Mulsant & Rey, 1854  (tropical Africa)
 Monodius Koch, 1956  (tropical Africa)
 Montagona G.S. Medvedev, 1998  (the Palearctic and Indomalaya)
 Moragacinella Español, 1954  (the Palearctic)
 Myatis Bates, 1879  (the Palearctic)
 Myladina Reitter, 1889  (the Palearctic)
 Nalepa Reitter, 1887  (the Palearctic)
 Namazopus Koch, 1963  (tropical Africa)
 Nemanes Fairmaire, 1888  (tropical Africa)
 Neobaphion Blaisdell, 1925  (North America)
 Neoisocerus Bouchard, Lawrence, Davies & Newton, 2005  (the Palearctic)
 Neopachypterus Bouchard, Löbl & Merkl, 2007  (the Palearctic and Indomalaya)
 Nepalindia G.S. Medvedev, 1998  (Indomalaya)
 Nesocaedius Kolbe, 1915  (the Palearctic and Indomalaya)
 Nesopatrum Gebien, 1921  (tropical Africa)
 Nevisia Marcuzzi, 1986  (the Neotropics)
 Nicandra Fairmaire, 1888  (tropical Africa)
 Nocibiotes Casey, 1895  (North America)
 Notibius LeConte, 1851  (North America)
 Notocorax Dejean, 1834  (Indomalaya)
 Nycterinus Eschscholtz, 1829  (the Neotropics)
 Ograbies Péringuey, 1899  (tropical Africa)
 Oncopteryx Gebien, 1943  (tropical Africa)
 Oncotus Blanchard, 1845  (tropical Africa)
 Oodescelis Motschulsky, 1845  (the Palearctic)
 Opatrinus Dejean, 1821  (the Neotropics)
 Opatroides Brullé, 1832  (North America, tropical Africa, Indomalaya, and Australasia)
 Opatrum Fabricius, 1775  (the Palearctic)
 Orarabion Leo & Liberto, 2011  (tropical Africa)
 Oreomelasma Español, 1975  (the Palearctic)
 Otinia Antoine, 1942  (the Palearctic)
 Pachymastus Fairmaire, 1896  (tropical Africa)
 Parabantodemus Iwan, 2000  (tropical Africa)
 Paraselinus Kaminski, 2013  (tropical Africa)
 Parastizopus Gebien, 1938  (tropical Africa)
 Pedinus Latreille, 1797  (the Palearctic and Indomalaya)
 Penthicinus Reitter, 1896  (the Palearctic)
 Penthicoides Fairmaire, 1896  (Indomalaya)
 Penthicus Faldermann, 1836  (the Palearctic and tropical Africa)
 Periblaps Bauer, 1921*
 Periloma Gebien, 1938  (tropical Africa)
 Perithrix Fairmaire, 1879  (the Palearctic)
 Peyerimhoffius Koch, 1948  (the Palearctic)
 Phaleriderma Koch, 1954  (tropical Africa)
 Phallocentrion Koch, 1956  (tropical Africa)
 Phelopatrum Marseul, 1876  (the Palearctic)
 Phylacastus Fairmaire, 1897  (tropical Africa)
 Phylacinus Fairmaire, 1896  (tropical Africa)
 Phylan Sturm, 1826  (the Palearctic)
 Phylanmania Ferrer, 2013  (the Palearctic)
 Phymatoplata Koch, 1956  (tropical Africa)
 Piscicula Robiche, 2004  (tropical Africa)
 Planostibes Gemminger, 1870  (tropical Africa)
 Platyburak Iwan, 1990  (Indomalaya)
 Platyburmanicus Iwan, 2003  (Indomalaya)
 Platycolpotus Iwan, 1997  (Indomalaya)
 Platylus Mulsant & Rey, 1859  (the Neotropics)
 Platynosum Mulsant & Rey, 1859  (the Palearctic)
 Platynotoides Kaszab, 1975  (Indomalaya)
 Platynotus Fabricius, 1801  (Indomalaya)
 Platyprocnemis Español & Lindberg, 1963  (tropical Africa)
 Platyscelis Latreille, 1818  (the Palearctic)
 Plesioderes Mulsant & Rey, 1859  (tropical Africa and Indomalaya)
 Pocadiopsis Fairmaire, 1896  (Indomalaya)
 Pokryszkiella Iwan, 1996  (tropical Africa)
 Polycoelogastridion Reichardt, 1936  (the Palearctic and Indomalaya)
 Prodilamus Ardoin, 1969  (the Palearctic and tropical Africa)
 Proscheimus Desbrochers des Loges, 1881  (the Palearctic)
 Prosodes Eschscholtz, 1829  (the Palearctic and Indomalaya)
 Protoblaps Bauer, 1921*
 Psammestus Reichardt, 1936  (the Palearctic)
 Psammoardoinellus Leo, 1981  (the Palearctic)
 Psammogaster Koch, 1953  (tropical Africa)
 Psectes Hesse, 1935  (tropical Africa)
 Psectrapus Solier, 1848  (tropical Africa)
 Pseudemmallus Koch, 1956  (tropical Africa)
 Pseudoblaps Guérin-Méneville, 1834  (the Palearctic and Indomalaya)
 Pseudognaptorina Kaszab, 1977  (the Palearctic and Indomalaya)
 Pseudolamus Fairmaire, 1874  (the Palearctic)
 Pseudoleichenum Ardoin, 1972  (tropical Africa)
 Pseudonotocorax Iwan, 1997  (Indomalaya)
 Pteroselinus Kaminski, 2015  (tropical Africa)
 Pythiopus Koch, 1953  (tropical Africa)
 Raynalius Chatanay, 1912  (tropical Africa)
 Reichardtiellina Kaszab, 1982  (the Palearctic)
 Remipedella Semenov, 1907  (the Palearctic)
 Rugoplatynotus Kaszab, 1975  (Indomalaya)
 Schelodontes Koch, 1956  (tropical Africa)
 Schyzoschelus Koch, 1954  (tropical Africa)
 Scleroides Fairmaire, 1883  (Australasia)
 Scleropatroides Löbl & Merkl, 2003  (the Palearctic, tropical Africa, and Indomalaya)
 Scleropatrum Reitter, 1887  (the Palearctic and Indomalaya)
 Sclerum Dejean, 1834  (the Palearctic, tropical Africa, and Indomalaya)
 Scymena Pascoe, 1866  (Australasia)
 Sebastianus Iwan, 1996  (tropical Africa)
 Selenepistoma Dejean, 1834  (tropical Africa)
 Selinopodus Koch, 1956  (tropical Africa)
 Selinus Mulsant & Rey, 1853  (tropical Africa)
 Silvestriellum Koch, 1956  (tropical Africa)
 Sinorus Mulsant & Revelière, 1861  (the Palearctic)
 Sintagona G.S. Medvedev, 1998  (the Palearctic)
 Sobas Pascoe, 1863  (Australasia)
 Socotropatrum Koch, 1970  (tropical Africa)
 Somocoelia Heyden & Kraatz, 1882  (the Palearctic)
 Somocoeloplatys Skopin, 1968  (the Palearctic)
 Sphaerostibes Koch, 1963  (tropical Africa)
 Stenogonopus Gebien, 1938  (tropical Africa)
 Stenolamus Gebien, 1920  (tropical Africa)
 Stizopus Erichson, 1843  (tropical Africa)
 Stridigula Koch, 1954  (tropical Africa)
 Styphacus Fairmaire, 1901  (tropical Africa)
 Sulpius Fairmaire, 1906  (tropical Africa)
 Syntyphlus Koch, 1953  (tropical Africa)
 Tagona Fischer von Waldheim, 1820  (the Palearctic)
 Tagonoides Fairmaire, 1886  (the Palearctic)
 Tarphiophasis Wollaston, 1877  (tropical Africa)
 Thaioblaps Masumoto, 1989  (Indomalaya)
 Thaumatoblaps Kaszab & G.S. Medvedev, 1984  (the Palearctic)
 Tidiguinia Español, 1959  (the Palearctic)
 Tonibiastes Casey, 1895  (North America)
 Tonibius Casey, 1895  (North America)
 Tragardhus Koch, 1956  (tropical Africa)
 Trichomyatis Schuster, 1931  (the Palearctic)
 Trichosternum Wollaston, 1861  (tropical Africa)
 Trichoton Hope, 1841  (North America and the Neotropics)
 Trigonopilus Fairmaire, 1893  (Indomalaya)
 Trigonopoda Gebien, 1914  (Indomalaya)
 Trigonopus Mulsant & Rey, 1853  (tropical Africa)
 Trogloderus Leconte, 1879  (North America)
 Ulus Horn, 1870  (North America and the Neotropics)
 Upembarus Koch, 1956  (tropical Africa)
 Viettagona G.S. Medvedev & Merkl, 2003  (Indomalaya)
 Weisea Semenov, 1891  (the Palearctic)
 Wolladrus Iwan & Kaminski, 2016  (the Palearctic)
 Xerolinus Ivie & Hart, 2016  (the Neotropics)
 Zidalus Mulsant & Rey, 1853  (the Palearctic and tropical Africa)
 Zophodes Fåhraeus, 1870  (tropical Africa)
 Zoutpansbergia Koch, 1956  (tropical Africa)
 † Eupachypterus Kirejtshuk, Nabozhenko & Nel, 2010
 † Palaeosclerum Nabozhenko & Kirejtshuk, 2017

References